The men's field hockey event at the 2014 Commonwealth Games was held at the Glasgow National Hockey Centre from 25 July to 3 August 2014. Australia defeated India in the final to take their fifth consecutive gold medal at the Commonwealth Games, whilst England defeated New Zealand on penalties in the bronze medal match.

Competition format
Two groups each of five teams were drawn. Pool A consisted of Scotland, Australia, India, South Africa and Wales; whilst pool B consisted of Canada, England, Malaysia, New Zealand and Trinidad and Tobago. The teams were required to play each other team in their group once in a group stage format. Three points were awarded for a win and one for a draw, with goal difference being necessary should the teams be tied on the same number of points.

The top two teams from each group qualified for the semifinals (the winner of group A playing the runner-up of group B and vice versa) whilst the teams which did not qualify played the team which achieved their position in the other group (i.e. 3rd place group A played 3rd place group B, 4th place group A played 4th place group B and 5th place group A played 5th place group B) to determine the fifth through to tenth-place rankings.

The winners of the semifinals qualified for the gold medal match whilst the losers played in the bronze medal match. England defeated New Zealand 4–2 on penalties after a 3–3 tie after normal time to take the bronze medal, whilst in the final Australia defeated India 4-0 after normal time to take their fifth consecutive men's hockey gold medal at the Commonwealth Games.

Results

Preliminary round

Pool A

Pool B

Fifth to tenth place classification

Ninth and tenth place

Seventh and eighth place

Fifth and sixth place

Medal round

Semifinals

Bronze medal match

Gold medal match

Final rankings

Goalscorers

References

Men